Governor Adams may refer to:

Alva Adams (governor) (1850–1922), Governor of Colorado
Billy Adams (politician) (1861–1954), Governor of Colorado, brother of Alva Adams.
James Hopkins Adams (1812–1861), Governor of South Carolina
Jewett W. Adams (1835–1920), Governor of Nevada
Samuel Adams (1722–1803), Governor of Massachusetts
Samuel Adams (Arkansas politician) (1805–1850), Acting Governor of Arkansas
Sherman Adams (1899–1986), Governor of New Hampshire

See also
Governor Adam (disambiguation)